William H. Nicholson (1869–1911) was the first African American fireman in the New York City Fire Department. He was assigned to Engine Company 6 and detailed to the veterinary department to feed the horses and shovel manure.

Biography

William H. Nicholson was born in 1869 in Virginia. He migrated to New York City and worked as a cement tester. He joined the New York City Fire Department in Brooklyn in 1898 and was detailed to the veterinary unit to feed the horses and shovel manure.

Nicholson retired because of his bad health in 1911 and died a few weeks later.

See also
Wesley Augustus Williams —Third African American fireman in the New York City Fire Department
Vulcan Society

Footnotes

1869 births
1911 deaths
African-American history in New York City
African-American segregation in the United States
New York City firefighters